Julieta Emilia Cazzuchelli (born 16 December 1993), known professionally as Cazzu, is an Argentine rapper and singer. Born and raised in Ledesma, Jujuy, she gained popularity with her singles "Loca", "Toda", "Pa Mi" and "Chapiadora".

Early life 
Julieta Emilia Cazzuchelli was born on 16 December 1993 in Ledesma, Jujuy. She had been interested in music since she was eleven years old. She started singing with her father, who was also a musician and who inspired her to become one. When she finished high school, she moved to Tucumán to study cinematography and, some time after, she moved to the Buenos Aires Province to study graphic design.

Career 
Cazzu started her musical career as a cumbia singer and then as a rock singer, in which she was not very successful. After kicking off her music career in cumbia and rock, she tested the waters in the urban scene, dropping real unapologetic songs about female empowerment. She started her musical career as Cazzu as an independent artist, paying for her first recordings and video clips. In an interview with Billboard Argentina, she said: "For me, Cazzu is everything I want to be. She's my alter ego, she's a damn superhero."

She gained popularity in the Latin trap music scene after the release of her collaboration "Loca" with fellow Argentine trap singers Khea and Duki. The song became even more popular after Bad Bunny joined for the remix.

Discography

Studio albums

Mixtapes

EPs

Singles

As lead artist

As a featured artist

Awards and nominations 
 

The Argentina awards could be imputed.

References 

1993 births
Living people
Latin trap musicians
Argentine trap musicians
Argentine reggaeton musicians
Argentine women rappers
Feminist musicians
People from Jujuy Province
21st-century Argentine women  singers
Women in Latin music